The Tsodilo thick-toed gecko (Pachydactylus tsodiloensis) is a species of lizard in the family Gekkonidae. It is endemic to Botswana.

References

Pachydactylus
Reptiles of Botswana
Reptiles described in 1966